is a Japanese manga series written and illustrated by Moyoco Anno. It was serialized in Shodensha's josei manga magazine Feel Young from November 2013 to March 2018, with its chapters collected in two tankōbon volumes,

Media

Manga
Written and illustrated by Moyoco Anno, Memoirs of Amorous Gentlemen was serialized in Shodensha's josei manga magazine Feel Young from November 8, 2013, to March 8, 2018. Shodensha collected its chapters in two tankōbon volumes, released on October 8, 2015, and January 25, 2019.

The series was digitally published in English by Crunchyroll Manga. Cork released the first volume digitally on July 23, 2019.

Other media
The series received a short anime adaptation, for the Japan Animator Expo project, which was released online in May 2015. Shirō Sagisu composed the music and Cork handled production.

In October 2020, it was announced that the series would inspire an American Broadway musical adaptation, which would be directed and choreographed by Rob Ashford and planned for a "worldwide release." Devin Keudell of Bespoke Theatricals is credited as general manager and Izumi Takeuchi is credited as producer.

Reception
The series received an Excellence Award at the 23nd Japan Media Arts Festival in 2020.

References

Further reading

External links
  
 
 

Crunchyroll manga
Josei manga
Moyoco Anno
Shodensha manga